WPGD-TV (channel 50) is a religious television station licensed to Hendersonville, Tennessee, United States, serving the Nashville area as an owned-and-operated station of the Trinity Broadcasting Network (TBN). The station's transmitter is located in Whites Creek, Tennessee, just off I-24 and Old Hickory Boulevard. Its studios are located at Trinity Music City on Music Village Boulevard in Hendersonville, which also acts as a host studio for several TBN programs and serves as a religious tourist attraction, in addition to its former role as the estate of the late country artist Conway Twitty.

History
Although it was granted a construction permit on September 17, 1987, the station did not sign on the air until September 24, 1992 as Nashville's over-the-air outlet of the Trinity Broadcasting Network, which it has exclusively broadcast since sign-on.
Its original analog transmitter was located along TN 109 in unincorporated Sumner County between Portland and Gallatin.

At one point during the 1990s, WPGD also operated a low-power translator, W36AK, serving Nashville proper due to the main transmitter's location, until it was discontinued at an unknown date.

Subchannels

References

External links

 
 

Sumner County, Tennessee
Trinity Broadcasting Network affiliates
PGD-TV
1992 establishments in Tennessee
Television channels and stations established in 1992